The Blackened Air is the second album by American singer-songwriter Nina Nastasia. It was released in 2002 by Touch and Go Records. The album was recorded almost completely live, with the band set up in a semi-circle in one corner of the studio, over a six-day period in 2001 at Steve Albini's Electrical Audio Studios in Chicago. The final track, "That's All There Is", was held over from sessions for her debut, Dogs.

Track listing
All songs written by Nina Nastasia.
"Run, All You…" – 1:39
"I Go With Him" – 1:54
"This Is What It Is" – 4:17
"Oh, My Stars" – 3:08
"All for You" – 1:27
"So Little" – 3:27
"Desert Fly" – 2:03
"Ugly Face" – 4:10
"In the Graveyard" – 3:12
"Ocean" – 5:59
"Rosemary" – 1:49
"The Same Day" – 2:15
"Been So Long" – 1:29
"The Very Next Day" – 0:33
"Little Angel" – 1:57
"That's All There Is" – 4:26

Credits and personnel
Musicians
 Nina Nastasia – guitar, vocals
 Jay Bellerose – drums
 Joshua Carlebach – accordion
 Stephen Day – cello
 Gerry Leonard – guitar, mandolin
 Gonzalo Munoz – saw
 Dave Richards – bass
 Dylan Willemsa – violin
 Peter Yanowitz – drums on "That's All There Is"

Production
 Steve Albini – engineering
 Kennan Gudjonsson – artwork, mastering, package design
 Steve Rooke – mastering

References

2002 albums
Albums produced by Steve Albini
Touch and Go Records albums
Nina Nastasia albums